Praetoria Augusta was a fort in the Roman province of Dacia.

See also
List of castra

External links
Roman castra from Romania - Google Maps / Earth

Notes

Historic monuments in Harghita County
Roman legionary fortresses in Romania
Ancient history of Transylvania